Owenmont is an unincorporated community in Ripley County, in the U.S. state of Missouri.

History
A post office called Owenmont was established in 1911, and remained in operation until 1925. The community has the name of George Owen, a businessperson in the local lumber industry.

References

Unincorporated communities in Ripley County, Missouri
Unincorporated communities in Missouri